AKM Nowsheruzzaman (5 December 1949 – 21 September 2020), better known as Nowsher, was a Bangladeshi footballer who played as a striker or left-winger. In 1971, he toured India with the Shadhin Bangla football team in order to raise international awareness about the Bangladesh Liberation War. After liberation, he was also part of the first ever Bangladesh national football team.

In 1973, Nowsher scored the only goal in a friendly match against Singapore, to give Bangladesh their inaugural international football win. While at club level, his best season was in 1975 for Mohammedan SC, when he became the Dhaka League top-scorer, with 21 goals.

Personal life
Born in Munshiganj Sardar, East Bengal, Nowsher's family had originally moved from Chandpur due to his father's job as a lawyer. Nowhser is the third oldest among seven brothers and two sisters. Five of his brothers were also footballers, among them Sharifuzzaman and Arifuzzaman played with alongside him at Mohammedan SC, in 1976. While the other two Ashraf and Mamun played in the Dhaka for Dilkusha SC and Victoria SC respectively.

In 1967, Nowsher came to Dhaka and got admitted to Dhaka University studying Zoology. Nowhser was married to Zafarin Zaman, with whom he had a daughter named Simin Noor Zaman and a son named Moinuzzaman.

Club career
Nowsher first came to Dhaka, in 1967, where he trialed for the East Pakistan Junior Team after being adviced from Azad Boys Club's Mohamed Mustaq, who had witnessed Nowsher's play in Munshiganj. During the trials, he impressed Sheikh Shaheb Ali, and was invited to the youth team's camp. While training with the youth team, Nowsher was accepted into Dhaka University, thus, deciding to stay in Dhaka and pursue football. He joined East Pakistan Railway Club in the same year, however, he did not make any appearances. In 1968, he would make his Dhaka League playing debut scoring twice for Wari Club, in a 3–1 victory over East End Club.

In 1969, he moved to Fire Service SC, after the club agreed to pay all his University expenses. The following year, he joined Victoria SC, and guided the team to a fourth-place finish, however, his club career was halted due to the Bangladesh Liberation War, in 1971. When the Dhaka League resumed in 1972, Nowsher joined Bangladesh W.A.P.D.A., and scored 16 goals in 7 games during the unfinished league season. At  W.A.P.D.A. Scottish coach Sandy converted Nowhser from a left-winger to a striker, and in 1973 he attracted interest from Mohammedan SC. After deciding to remain at the club, Nowsher linked up with Enayetur Rahman and helped W.A.P.D.A. finish the first half of the 1974 league season top of the table, however, during the second half the club's form fell due to some internal issues.

In 1975, Nowsher joined Mohammedan SC, a club which he supported from when a child. In his first year he became top-scorer with 21 goals, and they won the Dhaka League. That season he scored a bicycle kick against his former club Victoria SC and  also found the net in a famous 4–0 victory over Abahani Krira Chakra in the Dhaka Derby. The other scorers in the game were, Md Moin, Hafizuddin Ahmed and Wazed Gazi, while defender Shamsul Alam Manju made headlines for taunting Abahani team leader Sheikh Kamal. In 1976, Nowsher again became league champion, however he broke his leg that year and lost his regular spot in the team. In 1978, he joined Dhaka Wanderers and retired while playing for the club, in 1980.

International career
In 1971, during the Bangladesh Liberation War, Nowsher travelled to Agartala, India, where he met up with Mohammedan teammate Mohamed Kaikobad and his ex-colleague at W.A.P.D.A, Enayetur Rahman Khan. With Enaytur and Kaikobad, Nowsher played for Birendra Club in the Agartala League, and became champions. Later, Protap Shankar Hazra the vice-captain of the Shadhin Bangla football team, took the players to Kolkata to join the rest of the team. During a game against Bombay XI, Nowsher scored an Olympico goal in a 3–1 victory. After returning to the newly liberated country, Nowsher played for Bangladesh XI in the first football match held in Bangladesh, coming on as a substitute as his team lost 2–0 to Presidents XI.

On 13 May 1972, Nowsher played for Dhaka XI (unofficial national team), during their 1–0 win over Mohun Bagan AC, when the Indian club came to Bangladesh as the first international team. In 1972, Nowsher went to Guwahati with the Dhaka XI to play the Bordoloi Trophy. Nowsher was the team's top-scorer, as they finished runner-up losing to East Bengal Club in the final. One of his goals during the tournament came in a 2–0 over George Telegraph.

In 1973, Sheikh Shaheb Ali called up  eight players from W.A.P.D.A including Nowhser and his brother Sharifuzzaman, to the first Bangladesh national football team, which took part in Malaysia's Merdeka Tournament. After Bangladesh ended the tournament without a single win, the Bangladesh Football Federation decided to hold a friendly game with Singapore on their way back from Malaysia. On 13 August 1973, Nowsher scored the only goal against Singapore from a Monwar Hossain Nannu cross, as Bangladesh claimed their first ever win in international football. Nowsher's only other tournament with Bangladesh was the 1975 edition of the Merdeka Cup, as he was not called up to the team again after breaking his leg, in 1976.

International goals

Honours

Mohammedan SC
 Dhaka League = 1975, 1976

Awards and accolades

 Dhaka University Blue Award

Individual

 Dhaka League top scorer: 1975

Cricket career

During the football off season, Nowhser would play cricket. He joined Town Club in 1974 and was a crucial player for the Khulna-based team. As an all-rounder, he started playing cricket for Mohammedan SC the same year he won the football league with the club. The following year, they won the 1976 Independence Cup trophy with the Black & Whites. He played as an opening batsman with Raqibul Hasan in Mohammedan. Nowsher came out as an opener against Biman and batted the entire innings remaining Not out with 69 runs. He went onto play for Dhaka Wanderers, after he joined the club in 1978 and following his retirement from playing football in 1980, he kept on playing cricket with Victoria SC. In 1983, he joined Kala Bagan Krira Chakra, where he was captain for five years, before retiring from cricket in 1990. After independence, Nowsher is one of a few players to be part of both Mohammedan SC's first Dhaka League (1976) and Dhaka Premier Division Cricket League (1978) winning teams.

Cricket honours

Mohammedan SC
Dhaka Premier Division Cricket League: 1978
Independence Cup: 1976

Death
On 21 November 2020, Nowsher passed away at the age of 70 after being infected by COVID-19.

References

2020 deaths
1949 births
Bangladeshi footballers
Bangladesh international footballers
Mohammedan SC (Dhaka) players
People from Munshiganj District
Association football forwards
Deaths from the COVID-19 pandemic in Bangladesh